Sir Tupua Leupena  (2 August 1922 – 24 November 1996) was a political figure from the Pacific nation of Tuvalu. Leupena was the Speaker of the Parliament during 1978 in the prime ministership of Toaripi Lauti.

Governor-General of Tuvalu

Leupena served as the second Governor-General of Tuvalu from 1 March 1986 to 1 October 1990, representing  Elizabeth II, Queen of Tuvalu.

In common with most, but not all, of Tuvalu's Governors-General, Leupena accepted a Knighthood, on 24 July 1986.

Sir Tupua Leupena died on 24 November 1996, aged 74.

See also
 Politics of Tuvalu
 Parliament of Tuvalu

References

1922 births
1996 deaths
Speakers of the Parliament of Tuvalu
Governors-General of Tuvalu
Knights Grand Cross of the Order of St Michael and St George
Members of the Order of the British Empire